Rimula may refer to:
 Rimula (gastropod)
 Rimula (fungus)